Otto Knut Olof Folin (April 4, 1867 – October 25, 1934) was a Swedish-born American chemist who is best known for his groundbreaking work at Harvard University on practical micromethods for the determination of the constituents of protein-free blood filtrates and the discovery of creatine phosphate in muscles.

Background
Folin was born in Åseda, Småland in Sweden. He was the seventh of twelve children of Nils Magnus Folin and Eva Olson. He moved to America at the age of fifteen following two brothers and an aunt who had already settled there. He carried on his schooling in Stillwater, Minnesota. He moved to Minneapolis, Minnesota entering the University of Minnesota and completed his B.S in 1892.

Career
In 1896, Folin returned to Sweden and began his research in the laboratory of Prof. Olof Hammarsten (1841-1932) at Uppsala University. In 1897, he left to work in the laboratory of the chemist, Ernst Leopold Salkowski at the Pathological Institute of Charité (Charité - Universitätsmedizin Berlin) in Berlin, Germany. In 1890, he became a citizen of the United States. He joined the University of Chicago gaining his Ph.D. in 1898.

In 1899 he was appointed assistant professor at West Virginia University. He moved to the McLean Hospital Boston in 1900  as a research biochemist, eventually moving to Harvard Medical School in 1907 as an associate professor of biological chemistry, becoming the Hamilton Kuhn Professor of Biological Chemistry and Molecular Pharmacology in 1909. Together with Vintilă Ciocâlteu Otto Folin designed the Folin-Ciocalteu reagent to detect polyphenols. In 1920, he co-developed with Hsien Wu the Folin-Wu method of assaying glucose in protein-free filtrates of blood.

Folin was elected the president of the American Society of Biological Chemists (now the American Society for Biochemistry and Molecular Biology) in 1909. He was a member of the  editorial board  of the Journal of Biological Chemistry. He was elected to the National Academy of Sciences and was awarded the Carl Wilhelm Scheele Medal of the Swedish Chemical Society in 1930.

Selected works
Approximately complete analyses of thirty "normal" urines  (1905)
Chemical problems in hospital practice  (1908)
Nitrogen retention in the blood in experimental acute nephritis in the cat  (1912)
Preservatives and other chemicals in foods: Their use and abuse (1914)
 On the determination of creatinine and creatine in urine (1914)Recent biochemical investigations on blood and urine;: Their bearing on clinical and experimental medicine (1917)
 A System of Blood Analysis by Folin and Wu (1919)Laboratory Manual of Biological Chemistry with Supplement (1925)

See also
Folin's phenol reagent

References

Sources
Schaffer, Phillip Otto Folin: (1867–1934) (Journal of Nutrition.  volume  52,  issue  1, pages  3–11. 1954) 
Edsall, John T.  A Biomedical Pioneer: Otto Folin  (Science 12 May 1989:Vol. 244. no. 4905, pp. 719 - 720) 

Related reading
Meites, Samuel  (1989) Otto Folin, America's First Clinical Biochemist'' (American Association for Clinical Chemistry, Inc., Washington, D.C.)

External links
Otto Folin in biochemistry lab at McLean Hospital

1867 births
1934 deaths
People from Uppvidinge Municipality
American Lutherans
Swedish emigrants to the United States
American biochemists
Harvard Medical School faculty
West Virginia University faculty
University of Chicago alumni
University of Minnesota alumni